Harvey White FRCS (born 1936) is a retired surgeon and oncologist. He is a past president of the Medical Society of London and vice-president of the British Association of Surgical Oncology and the Royal Society of Medicine.

Early life
Harvey White was born in 1936. He was educated at Winchester College between 1949 and 1954, and Magdalen College, Oxford. He trained in medicine at St Bartholomew's Hospital.

Career
White was elected a fellow of the Royal College of Surgeons in 1970.

In 1976, he became consultant surgeon at the Royal Marsden Hospital, and later at King Edward VII Hospital for Officers, St Luke's Hospital for the Clergy and The London Clinic.

Between 1986 and 2003, he was chairman of the Brendoncare Foundation, following which he was appointed Chair of the Vice Patrons Committee.

He was president of the Osler Club of London 1986–87.

He is a past president of the Medical Society of London and vice-president of the British Association of Surgical Oncology and the Royal Society of Medicine. In 2012 he was the first recipient of the Royal Society of Medicine Medal.

Retirement
He founded and chairs the Old Wykehamist Medical Society.

White was a co-founder of the Retired Fellows’ Society at the Royal Society of Medicine in London. In addition, he gathered some of its members, and others, to write a book on retirement planning.

After being at The London Clinic as consultant surgeon, for over fifteen years, he wrote a book about the Clinic entitled History of the London Clinic: A Celebration of 75 Years.

Personal and family
In 1965, White  married Diana Bannister. They have a daughter, Phyllida, and son Charles.

Selected publications
"Surgery in the eighteenth and nineteenth centuries," in Victor Cornelius Medvei and J. L. Thornton (eds.), The Royal Hospital of Saint Bartholomew, 1123–1973. London: St Bartholomew's Hospital, 1974.
 The Greater Omentum. Springer Verlag, 1983. (Edited jointly with Dorothea Liebermann-Meffert & E. Vaubel) 
 A Colour Atlas of Omental Transposition for Advanced Breast Carcinoma. Wolfe Medical, 1987. 

 A Century of International Progress and Tradition in Surgery: An Illustrated History of the International Society of Surgery. Kaden Verlag, Heidelberg, 2001. (Jointly with Dorothea Liebermann-Meffert) 
 A Career in Medicine: Do You Have What it Takes? Royal Society of Medicine Press (RSMP), London, 2000. (Editor)  
 Retiring from Medicine: Do You Have What it Takes? RSMPs, London, 2002. (Editor)  
 A History of the London Clinic: A celebration of 75 years. RSMP, London, 2007.

See also
List of honorary medical staff at King Edward VII's Hospital for Officers

References

External links 
www.expertsearch.co.uk www.expertsearch.co.uk
www.harveywhite.me Harvey White website

Living people
1936 births
People educated at Winchester College
Alumni of Magdalen College, Oxford
British surgeons
British oncologists
Fellows of the Royal College of Surgeons
British medical writers
British medical historians
Presidents of the Osler Club of London
Physicians of the Royal Marsden Hospital